Wilbon Harrison Daniel (September 25, 1922 – December 30, 2013) was a history professor at University of Richmond, Virginia Intermont College, Vanderbilt University and Duke University who authored numerous books, articles, and essays. He specialized in Southern church history.

Partial list of books authored
Baseball and Richmond: A History of the Professional Game, 1884–2000, 2002 (with Scott P. Mayer)
Bedford County, Virginia, 1840–1860, 1985
Frontier Baptist Activities, 1780–1803, 1947
Historical Atlas of the Methodist Movement, 2009
History at the University of Richmond, 1991
Jimmie Foxx: The Life and Times of a Baseball Hall of Famer, 1907–1967, 2004
Practicing the Future Perfect: Ministry Practices and Communal Mission in the New Testament, 2004
River Road Church, Baptist: A History, 1945–1995, 1996
Southern Protestantism in the Confederacy, 1989
The University of Richmond, 1971–1999, 2000
Virginia Baptists, 1860–1902, 1987

Notes
His works have been cited heavily by other authors and writers, including historian Rhys Isaac, historian Philip S. Foner, University of Tennessee, Chattanooga Professor Emeritus Charles H. Lippy, Princeton University Professor Emeritus John Frederick Wilson, University of Mississippi professor Charles Reagan Wilson, historian David Brion Davis, and historian Charles Royster. His biography of Major League Baseball Hall of Fame player Jimmie Foxx was reviewed in the Journal of Sports History.

Personal life
Daniel was born in Lynchburg, Virginia and attended New London Academy in Forest, Virginia. He later attended Lynchburg College, Vanderbilt University and Duke University. He was married to biologist Margaret Anne Daniel; they had one child, the professor, writer and editor Anne Margaret Daniel. He died at home at the age of 91, in Richmond, Virginia.

References

1922 births
2013 deaths
American male writers
People from Lynchburg, Virginia